The following is a list of squads for each nation competing in the 2022 EAFF E-1 Football Championship, held from 19 to 27 July in the cities of Kashima and Toyota, Japan. Each nation needed to submit a squad of 26 players, including 3 goalkeepers.

Age, caps and goals as of one day previous to the start of the tournament, 18 July 2022.

China
Head coach:  Aleksandar Janković

Source:

Hong Kong
Head coach:  Jørn Andersen

 

Source:

Japan
Head coach: Hajime Moriyasu

Source:

South Korea
Head coach:  Paulo Bento

Source:

References

EAFF E-1 Football Championship squads